Tivoli is a historic home located at Baltimore, Maryland, United States. It is a random stone ashlar masonry structure built about 1855 and consisting of a three-story, symmetrical Italianate main block, with a contemporary two-story, "T"-shaped service wing.  It contains the administrative and clinical offices, the infirmary, and dining hall of the Woodbourne Center.  It was the summer residence of Enoch Pratt, who purchased the property in 1870 and died here in 1896. It was also a home of Charles S. Abell, one of the owners of the Baltimore Sun Papers and whose wife gave the property to Woodbourne in 1925. It currently serves as the administrative building for the Woodbourne Center, a mental health treatment center for young adolescents.

Tivoli was listed on the National Register of Historic Places in 1980.

References

External links
, including undated photo, at Maryland Historical Trust
Woodbourne Center website

Houses on the National Register of Historic Places in Baltimore
Houses in Baltimore
Houses completed in 1855
Italianate architecture in Maryland
Northern Baltimore